Samuel Thomas Dickson Wallace VC (7 March 1892 – 2 February 1968) was a Scottish recipient of the Victoria Cross, the highest and most prestigious award for gallantry in the face of the enemy that can be awarded to British and Commonwealth forces.

Details
He was 25 years old, and a temporary lieutenant in the 'C' Battery 63rd Brigade, Royal Field Artillery, British Army during the First World War when the following deed took place for which he was awarded the VC.

On 30 November 1917 at Gonnelieu, France, when the personnel of Lieutenant Wallace's battery were reduced to five, having lost their commander and five sergeants, and were surrounded by enemy infantry, he maintained the firing of the guns by swinging the trails close together, the men running and loading from gun to gun. He was in action for eight hours firing the whole time and inflicting severe casualties on the enemy. Then, owing to the exhausted state of his men, he withdrew when the infantry supports arrived, taking with him all essential gun parts and all wounded.

Further information
He later achieved the rank of captain. He is buried in Moffat Cemetery, Dumfries and Galloway, Scotland on right side of main gate.

The medal
His Victoria Cross is displayed at the Royal Artillery Museum, Woolwich, England.

References

Monuments to Courage (David Harvey, 1999)
The Register of the Victoria Cross (This England, 1997)
Scotland's Forgotten Valour (Graham Ross, 1995)

External links
Location of grave and VC medal (Dumfries & Galloway, Scotland)

1892 births
1968 deaths
People from Thornhill, Dumfries and Galloway
British World War I recipients of the Victoria Cross
Royal Artillery officers
British Army personnel of World War I
British Army recipients of the Victoria Cross